Pedro Daza Valenzuela (4 March 1925 – 8 October 2005) was a Chilean lawyer and politician.

References

1925 births
2005 deaths
University of Chile alumni
University of the Republic (Uruguay) alumni
Radical Party of Chile politicians
National Renewal (Chile) politicians